The following describes the population of towns in Tamil Nadu, India.

Urban Administration 
Tamil Nadu, the 11th largest state in India by area. As of 2020, the state has 38 districts, 21 municipal corporations and 138 municipalities. On 14 February 2019, the state government announced in the Assembly that Hosur and Nagercoil will be upgraded to municipal corporations. Avadi became municipal corporation on 19 June 2019.and 24 August 2021 Government of TamilNadu upgrade 6 special grade municipality into city corporation there are Kumbakonam, Karur, Kanchipuram, Tambaram, Cuddalore and Sivakasi

Developmental administration in Tamil Nadu is carried out by Panchayat Unions (called blocks) in rural areas.  These panchayat unions have a set of panchayat villages under them.  In urban areas, the governance is done by municipal corporations, municipalities or town panchayats based on the size of the town. The Revenue divisions and Taluks of the state. These administrative units are classified based on the district.  There are 38 districts in Tamil Nadu and for revenue administration purposes, each district is divided into divisions, which are further divided to Taluks.  Each of these Taluks have a list of revenue villages under them. Tahsildar is the head of these Taluks.

Demographics
Among the cities in 2011, the state capital, Chennai, was the most populous city in the state, followed by Coimbatore, Madurai, Tiruchirappalli , Salem and Tiruppur respectively.

  – Municipal corporations
  – Municipalities
  – Chennai Metropolitan Area
  – Coimbatore metropolitan area
 – Salem Metropolitan Area
  – Erode Metropolitan Area
  – Tirupur Metropolitan Area
  – Madurai metropolitan area

References

See also
 List of cities in Tamil Nadu by population

Tamil Nadu-related lists
Tamil Nadu